This list of reference sources provides an overview of notable works related to the historical novel, Marthandavarma on various media; that are used or not used but referred or used and removed as citation sources in the main article page and in the pages about allusions and characters.

Bibliography
Scripted sources that are referred for citations are under primary, secondary, tertiary sections, where as the quaternary section consists of reference sources that are primarily used to validate the credibility of authors of works mentioned in the first three sections.

Primary

Source Novel

Translation

Abridgement

Comics

Textbook

Secondary

History
 
 
 
 
 
 
 
 
 
  Translation of

Literary study

Biography

Ballads and legends

Geography

Lyrical works

News

Cinema study

Theatre study

Periodicals

Web

Referral

Reports

Tertiary

Early Novels

Life style practices

Writing style

Quaternary

AV media

Television

Radio

Movie

Notes

References

Further reading
 
 
 
 
 
 
 
 
 
 
 
 

Marthandavarma